The traditions of Bates College include the activities, songs, and academic regalia of Bates College, a private liberal arts college in Lewiston, Maine. They are well known on campus and nationally as an embedded component of the student life at the college and its history. 

While some traditions have wide-ranging campus support, others are officially discouraged by the administration. Many traditions are paralleled at peer schools in the New England Small College Athletic Conference (NESCAC), and in the Ivy League. Bates along with Bowdoin and Colby College share multiple traditions and rivalries that comprise the Colby-Bates-Bowdoin Consortium (informally known as the CBB).

The college's most famous tradition is Newman Day, which received national attention when Paul Newman–the namesake of the tradition–publicly denounced it, asking the then-President Thomas Hedley Reynolds to institutionally bar the activity. The tradition continues to this day; however, it is not sponsored by the administration.

Wintertime traditions

Winter Carnival 

The Bates Outing Club, on odd to even years since 1920, has held a Winter Carnival which comprises a themed four-day event that includes performances, dances, and games. Past Winter Carnivals have included "a Swiss Olympic skier swooshing down Mount David", faculty and student football games, faculty and administration skits, over-sized snow sculptures, "serenading of the dormitories", and an expeditions to Camden. When alumnus Edmund Muskie, Class of 1936, was a Governor of Maine, he participated in a torch relay from Augusta to Lewiston in celebration of the 1960 Winter Olympics. Robert F. Kennedy, with his naval classmates, built a replica of their boat back in Massachusetts out of snow in front of Smith Hall, during their carnival. This tradition is second only to Dartmouth College (1910) as the oldest of its kind in the United States, and serves as a major contribution to the connection between the two colleges.

Mustachio Bashio 
An annual party celebrating beards and mustaches held during winter carnival. The tradition was profiled by The New York Times in 2010.

Newman Day 

Research has shown references made to Newman Day in The Bates Student as early as the late 1970s, however, the day was marked originally with students throwing food at each other in the dining hall. The tradition was debuted in the January 1976 Winter Carnival with one of the student exclaiming that Paul Newman once said "24 hours in a day, 24 beers in a case. Coincidence? I think not," as a rhetorical mandate. Originally named Paul Newman Day, it was subsequently renamed Newman Day, and includes activities where one consumes one beer every hour during the hours 12:00 am to 11:59 pm on April 24th. 

Newman opposed the tradition, which received media attention in 2004 after Newman's lawyer sent a letter to Princeton University and Bates registering Newman's disapproval, and requesting that the event be disassociated from his name, due to the fact that he did not endorse the behaviors. Bates disavowed any responsibility for the event, responding that Newman Day is not sponsored, endorsed, or encouraged by the university itself and is solely an unofficial event among students. Celebration of Newman Day has continued, however, and participants indulge during the stipulated 24-hour period, during which participants are forbidden to sleep or vomit; sleeping or vomiting constitutes a "reset" that negates previous consumption, requiring the participant to restart from zero.

Puddle Jump 

Originally taking place on a day near Saint Patrick's Day, March 17, but since incorporated as part of Winter Carnival in late January, the Bates College Outing Club cuts a hole by a chainsaw or by the original axe used in the inaugural Puddle Jump of 1975, in the ice on Lake Andrews. Students from all class years jump into the hole, often in costumes, to celebrate, "exuberance at the end of a hard winter." By mid-evening, they eat donuts, drink cider and receive a cappella performances.

Summertime traditions

Ivy day 
The class graduates participate in an Ivy Day which installs a granite Ivy Stone onto one of the academic or residential buildings on campus. They serve as a symbol of the class and their respective history both academically and socially. Some classes donate to the college, in the form gates, facades, and door outlines, by inscribing or creating their own version of symbolic icons of the college's seal or other prominent insignia. This usually occurs on graduation day, but may occur on later dates with alumni returning to the campus. This tradition is shared with the University of Pennsylvania and Princeton University. On Ivy Day, members of Phi Beta Kappa are announced.

Sumner's chair 

Bates' founder was a friend of U.S. Senator Charles Sumner who was among the most radical of the abolitionists in the U.S. Congress. Sumner also believed in integrated schools and equal rights for all races. Cheney asked Sumner to create a collegiate motto for Bates and he suggested the Latin phrase amore ac studio which he translated as "with love for learning" or "with ardor and devotion." 

On the afternoon of May 22, 1856, Preston Brooks confronted Sumner in the Senate chamber and assaulted him with a cane after reading Sumner's speech regarding the Kansas–Nebraska Act. After the incident the chair was gifted to Bates. It is used for inaugurations, graduations and other formal occasions.

Other traditions 
Bates has many other official and unofficial annual traditions including WRBC's Annual Trivia Night (since 1979), Ronjstock (since 2000), Senior Pub crawl Parade to the Goose, Lick-It, Eighties Dance, Halloween Dance, Class Dinner, Harvest Dinner, Triad Dance (since 1981), Stanton Ride (1800s to 1960s, with a revival by VP Hiss in 2000s), Clambake at Popham Beach and Winter Carnival by the Outing Club (since 1920), Alumni Reunion Parade (since 1914), and the annual Oxford-Bates debate (since 1921)

Traditions with Bowdoin 
From its inception, Bates College served as an alternative to a more traditional and historically conservative Bowdoin College. There is a long tradition of rivalry and competitiveness between the two colleges, revolving around socioeconomic class, academic quality, and collegiate athletics. Many alumni of Bowdoin subsequently went on to develop Bates during the 1860s and alumni of Bates lectured at Bowdoin. Bates and Bowdoin have competed against each other athletically since the 1870s, and subsequently share one of the ten oldest NCAA Division III football rivalries, in the United States.

The rivalry between the two colleges has grown out of academics and social standing, moving to athletics. Traditions have grown out this rivalry in their respective athletic programs. Originally started by the debate team of Bates College, the football team has participated in wrapping the college's academic scarf around Bowdoin's polar bear, in "an assertion of who's who." 

The taunts between the fan bases have grown and adapted in the modern era of the rivalry. The unison chant of "Blowdoin" is ubiquitous at games between the rivals. Athletic games are commonly accompanied with taunts and chants from both sides of the field. During the 1950s and late 1960s, Bowdoin focused on faulting Bates for accepting women and African Americans to their school chanting remarks revolving around racism and sexism, where Bates counter-chanted noting Bowdoin's elitism and racism. Both schools' fans are heard often exchanging the taunt of "safety school", and commenting on their respective college's issues regarding white privilege, cost of tuition, sexual assault, and social elitism. Both schools follow a narrative when chanting at football games, Bowdoin focuses on disparaging Bates for perceived lower academic standards and low endowment contrasted with expensive tuition, traditionally chanting "Ivy-rejects", "dirty Lews [in reference to the low economic development of Lewiston]", and "all that money and no [shot, touchdown etc.]."

Bates follows an anti-Bowdoin narrative that includes a perceived inferiority to Harvard University, historical ties to slavery, sexual assault, and drug use, often chanting, "Blowdoin", "Harvard-reject," "plantation boys", and "bow down Bowdoin [asserting moral superiority]."

The Bates-Bowdoin Game is the most attended football game every academic year at both colleges. As of 2013, both college's presidents are named Clayton (Spencer and Rose), leading students to include them in chants against each other. Bowdoin developed a "football fight song" entitled, "Forward the White" in 1913. All football games between the two occurred on Bates' Garcelon Field (1899) and Bowdoin's Whittier Field (1902).

See also 
 History of Bates College
 Dartmouth College traditions
 List of colleges and universities in Maine
 Liberal arts colleges in the United States

References

Further reading 

 Alfred, Williams Anthony. Bates College and Its Background. (1936) Online Deposit.
 Stuan, Thomas. The Architecture of Bates College. (2006)
 Chase, Harry. Bates College was named after Mansfield Man. (1878)
 Woz, Markus. Bates College – Traditionally Unconventional. (2002)
 Bates College Archives. Bates College Catalog. (1956–2017).  2017 Catalog.
 Bates College Archives. Maine State Seminary Records. Online Deposit.
 Bates College Archives. Bates College Oral History Project. Online Deposit.
 Clark, Charles E. Bates Through the Years: an Illustrated History. (2005) 
 Smith, Dana. Bates College – U. S. Navy V-12 Program Collection. (1943) Online Deposit.
 Eaton, Mabel. General Catalogue of Bates College and Cobb Divinity School. (1930)
 Larson, Timothy. Faith by Their Works: The Progressive Tradition at Bates College. (2005)
 Calhoun, Charles C. A Small College in Maine. p. 163. (1993)
 Johnnett, R. F. Bates Student: A Monthly Magazine. (1878)
 Phillips, F. Charles Bates College in Maine: Enduring Strength and Scholarship. Issue 245. (1952)
 Dormin J. Ettrude, Edith M. Phelps, Julia Emily Johnsen. French Occupation of the Ruhr: Bates College Versus Oxford Union Society of Oxford College. (1923)
 The Bates Student. The Voice of Bates College. (1873–2017)
 Emeline Cheney; Burlingame, Aldrich. The story of the life and work of Oren Burbank Cheney, founder and first president of Bates College. (1907) Online Version.

Bates College